Casy Island is the largest feature in a group of small islands lying  southeast of Lafarge Rocks and  northeast of Coupvent Point, off the north side of Trinity Peninsula. It was discovered and named by a French expedition under Captain Jules Dumont d'Urville, 1837–40.

See also 
 List of Antarctic and sub-Antarctic islands

References 

Islands of Trinity Peninsula